The Mauritius Revenue Authority (MRA) is a parastatal organisation in Mauritius, it is the Revenue Authority of the Mauritian Government and operate under the  aegis of the Ministry of Finance and Economic Development. The MRA is responsible for the assessment of liability, the collection and the accountability for Tax and the management, operation and enforcement of Revenue Laws.

Functions
According to Section 4, part 1 of the Mauritius Revenue Authority Act 2004, the functions of the MRA shall be to;

See also
Revenue service

References

External links

Revenue services
Government agencies of Mauritius
Government agencies established in 2004
2004 establishments in Mauritius